Eamonn O'Hara (born 6 September 1975) was until 2013 the longest-serving Gaelic footballer at senior level. He first played in 1994 before officially announcing his retirement from inter-county football on 14 May 2013.

He plays for his local club Tourlestrane and, though he also played at senior level for the Sligo county team, where he was a long-serving talisman. O'Hara still won one All Star during his career and was twice called up for Ireland in the International Rules Series.

Since retiring, he has become involved in punditry and management.

Playing career
O'Hara has had some success with his club team Tourlestrane, winning eight Sligo Senior Football Championships – in 1994, 1997, 1999, 2004, 2007, 2009, 2011 and 2013. He was a member of the Benada Abbey team which won the All-Ireland colleges B title in 1992, beating Edenderry in the final after a replay.

O'Hara made his senior Sligo debut in 1994. He was named at centre forward in the 2002 All-Star football team, becoming only the third Sligo player in history to get an All Star.

In 2001 and 2002, O'Hara played for Ireland against Australia in the International Rules Series.

O'Hara won a Connacht Senior Football Championship medal for Sligo in 2007. This victory made Sligo the Connacht champions for the first time since 1975.

O'Hara's inter-county career highlight was his scoring of a brilliant individual goal against Galway in the 2007 Connacht Senior Football Championship Final. His scoring ability earned him a sponsorship deal of gold boots through parent company Nike. In 2008, Sligo were beaten by Mayo and ended up in the Tommy Murphy Cup following on from a league campaign that brought relegation to Division 4 – O'Hara said he was ""embarrassed by the decline back into mediocrity.

In January 2013, O Hara announced he would be taking a break from inter-county football due to work commitments, though suggested he would return some day. In May 2013, RTÉ announced him as an addition to their GAA analysis panel. He predicted that Galway would beat Mayo and Sligo would beat London and that Sligo and Galway would meet in the Connacht Final. In the end Mayo saw off Galway and London defeated Sligo.

O'Hara later announced his retirement from inter-county football and said, "while Gaelic football has been, and continues to be a massive part of my life, I believe after nearly two decades wearing the Sligo jersey, the time is right for me to step aside. I do so knowing that I was very privileged to have played for my county, my province and my country."

Punditry

No sooner had O'Hara landed his bottom into Joe Brolly's armchair at Montrose than his old team Sligo were off to London for their routine quarter-final holiday, Leitrim lying in wait in the semi-final when Sligo had their opening Connacht Championship match of 2013 out of the way. It proved to be their only match of Championship 2013. Sligo lost to London, giving The Exiles their first Connacht Championship victory since 1977 and the second in their history. With RTÉ concentrating on more important matters – the live big game of the day was reigning All-Ireland Champions Donegal's dismantling of Tyrone – O'Hara launched a stinging tirade at his former manager Kevin Walsh on national television and told him to resign. He gave his inside view of the chaos affecting the county as Pat Spillane peered down his nose over O'Hara's right shoulder, baffled at the news that a county like Sligo could be in an even worse state than Kerry.

Then O'Hara called Walsh "crazy."

Former Armagh footballer Oisín McConville said O'Hara was out of line with his outburst and pointed out that most teams, apart from those to have played in that year's All-Ireland final, go back training in November. Following defeat to Derry in the next game and elimination from the Championship, Walsh resigned as Sligo boss.

Management career
O'Hara has managed his club Tourlestrane.

Honours
 1 Connacht Senior Football Championship (2007)
 1 All Star (2002)
 1 National Football League Division 3 (2010)
 1 National Football league Division 4 (2009)
 1 International Rules Series (2001)
 1 All-Ireland B Colleges (1992)
 8 Sligo Senior Football Championships (1994, 1997, 1999, 2004, 2007, 2009, 2011, 2013)

References

1975 births
Living people
Gaelic football forwards
Gaelic football managers
Gaelic games commentators
Gaelic games writers and broadcasters
Irish international rules football players
Sligo inter-county Gaelic footballers
Tourlestrane Gaelic footballers